I-372 was an Imperial Japanese Navy Type D1 transport submarine. Completed and commissioned in November 1944, she served in World War II and was sunk in July 1945.

Construction and commissioning

I-372 was laid down on 10 February 1944 by the Yokosuka Naval Arsenal at Yokosuka, Japan, with the name Submarine No. 2961. She was launched on 26 June 1944 and renamed I-372 that day. She was completed and commissioned on 8 November 1944.

Service history

Upon commissioning, I-372 was attached to the Sasebo Naval District and was assigned to Submarine Squadron 11 for workups. She was reassigned to Submarine Squadron 7 on 8 January 1945.

Transport operations
On 8 February 1945, I-372 departed Yokosuka bound for Takao on Formosa. She arrived at Kure on 14 February 1945.

The Japanese next considered sending I-372 to Iwo Jima with a cargo of artillery shells, but abandoned the idea. Instead, on 16 February 1945 I-372 began conversion at the Kure Naval Arsenal into a tanker submarine capable of carrying 90 metric tons of aviation gasoline. During her conversion, she probably also had a submarine snorkel installed.

On 1 April 1945, I-372 departed Yokosuka on a supply voyage to Wake Island. On 4 April 1945, Fleet Radio Unit, Melbourne (FRUMEL), an Allied signals intelligence unit headquartered at Melbourne, Australia, reported that it had intercepted and decrypted Japanese signal traffic indicating that a Japanese submarine would arrive at Wake Island on 17 April 1945 and begin several nights of unloading and loading operations there. The United States Navy submarine  was alerted to this at 04:00 on 16 April 1945 via an Ultra intelligence signal from Guam and moved to intercept the Japanese submarine.

I-372′s radar detector failed to detect Sea Owl′s radar signal, and I-372 anchored at Wake without her crew realizing  that any Allied forces were in the area. Two of them failed to detonate, and the third missed I-372 but destroyed Wake Island's pier. I-372 crash-dived, and after World War II the U.S. Joint Army-Navy Assessment Committee erroneously credited Sea Owl with sinking the submarine  that day.

I-372 did not surface again until 19 April 1945, when she finished unloading her cargo — which included enough rice to feed Wake Island's garrison for ten days — and embarked 29 passengers. She then got underway for Yokosuka, which she reached on 29 April 1945.

I-372′s next supply run also was to Wake Island. She avoided interception by Allied forces, however, and arrived at Wake on 28 June 1945, unloaded her cargo, and headed back to Yokosuka, where she arrived on 10 July 1945.

Loss

The attack killed one member of her crew, and a bomb that landed close aboard ruptured her starboard cargo hold. She slowly sank. Deemed beyond salvage, she was abandoned.

Final disposition

Hostilities between Japan and the Allies came to an end on 15 August 1945, and in September 1945 U.S. Navy divers from the submarine tender  inspected I-372′s wreck. The Japanese struck her from the Navy list on 15 September 1945. In August 1946 the wreck was refloated, towed into deep water, and scuttled.

Notes

Sources
 Hackett, Bob & Kingsepp, Sander.  IJN Submarine I-372: Tabular Record of Movement.  Retrieved on September 19, 2020.

Type D submarines
Ships built by Yokosuka Naval Arsenal
1944 ships
World War II submarines of Japan
Japanese submarines lost during World War II
Maritime incidents in July 1945
Maritime incidents in 1946
Shipwrecks in the Pacific Ocean
Shipwrecks of Japan
Submarines sunk by aircraft
Scuttled vessels